Pisarevos a village in Northern Bulgaria. The village is a part of Gorna Oryahovitsa Municipality, Veliko Tarnovo Province. According to the 2020 Bulgarian census, the village has a population of 1079 people with a permanent address registered there.

Geography 
Pisarevo village is located at an elevation of 72 meters. Initially the village was located in the Lozitsa area, and then it was moved on the left shore of Yantra river, and finally it settled in its current location.

The main occupation of the inhabitants is animal husbandry.

Culture 
The first written text found about the village of Pisarevo dates back to the Emperor soldier of the Roman Empire - Trajan.

The old name of the village used to be Yzazhikyoy which meant the blind Turks. The village was moved three times before it settles to its current location.

More than 800 of the 1000 population of the village are Muslims.

Buildings 
During the period after the merger of the two villages Sergyuvets and Teminsko, Parvomaytsi flourishes as a settlement. Most buildings were built during that time.

 In 1867, the first school in Pisarevo was established. The homes of villagers were used as classrooms due to the lack of a school building.
 The first church school was built in 1870.   
 In 1930 the high school of the village was built.
 In 1929, one of the largest fountains of the municipality was built in Pisarevo. 
 In 1991, a Mosque was built.
 In 1905, the library and community hall “Saglasie” was built.

Ethnicity 
According to the Bulgarian population census in 2011.

References 

Villages in Veliko Tarnovo Province